The Palacio de Recreación y Deportes German Wilkins Vélez Ramírez is a coliseum located in the city of Mayagüez, Puerto Rico. It has capacity for 5,500 spectators. It was remodeled in preparation for the 2010 Central American and Caribbean Games. In March 2008, José Guillermo Rodríguez, mayor of the city, announced in a concert given by Wilkins that after the Central American and Caribbean Games the arena would have the name of Germán Wilkins Vélez Ramírez, commonly known as "Wilkins". Wilkins inaugurated the arena (not the actual coliseum) with a concert 20 years before. The arena also has an acoustic conch outside, it bears the name of another Mayagüez native Frankie Ruiz.

The arena is also the home of Baloncesto Superior Nacional professional basketball team, Indios de Mayagüez since 1981. Also the professional volleyball team Indias de Mayagüez from Liga de Voleibol Superior Femenino, plays at the arena. It is located across the street of the Parque de los Próceres.

Keylla Hernandez ceremony
Part of the funeral services of the famous Puerto Rican television news anchorwoman, Keylla Hernandez. were held at the Palacio de Recreacion y Deportes on January 2, 2019.

References

Sports in Mayagüez, Puerto Rico
Buildings and structures in Mayagüez, Puerto Rico
Indoor arenas in Puerto Rico
Basketball venues in Puerto Rico
2010 Central American and Caribbean Games venues
1981 establishments in Puerto Rico
Sports venues completed in 1981